Reverse?! is a yaoi manga illustrated by Kazuhiko Mishima.

Plot 
A teacher begins his new position at an all-boys school. It's not long after that one of his students starts to hit on him. Another student becomes jealous and glares at them when they're together. Even though the teacher is straight, he decides to humor the boys and make a game out of the situation. But fun soon devolves into chaos as the teacher tries to keep away his young admirer.

Characters 
Anemiya is the new math teacher at an all-boys school. He deals with his frustrations in life by playing a joke on Mifune and Kijima, two gay students of his. However, this plan soon backfires: Mifune develops a dangerous obsession with Anemiya, and Kijima is the only one who can save him.

Mifune is one of Anemiya's students. At first he seems innocent, but he soon develops a violent obsession with Anemiya.

Kijima is another of Anemiya's students. He seems cold and covetous at first, but he proves to be noble after rescuing Anemiya from Mifune. Soon afterward, Anemiya and Kijima begin a relationship.

Manga series
2004 manga
Comedy anime and manga
Yaoi anime and manga